Tukums District was an administrative division of Latvia, located in Courland region, in the country's west.

Districts were eliminated during the administrative-territorial reform in 2009.

Districts of Latvia